is a railway station on the Chikuhi Line of Kyushu Railway Company (JR Kyushu), located in Karatsu, Saga Prefecture, Japan.

Lines

Station layout 
The station, which is unstaffed, consists of a side platform serving a single track on a low embankment. There is no station building but a shelter is provided on the platform. In addition, the municipal authorities have set up a waiting room named "Aki Sakura-kan" (meaning Autumn Cherry Blossom Room) near the station entrance. A bike shed is provided nearby.

Adjacent stations

History
This station was opened on the same day as an intermediate station on the new track under the name . The Kitakyushi Railway was nationalised on 1 October 1937 and Japanese Government Railways (JGR) assumed control of the station, changed the name again to Sari and designated the track which served it as part of the Chikuhi Line. The station was closed on 10 August 1941 and reopened on 1 June 1946. With the privatization of Japanese National Railways (JNR), the successor of JGR, on 1 April 1987, control of the station passed to JR Kyushu.

Passenger statistics
In fiscal 2015, there were a total of 3,342 boarding passengers, giving a daily average of 9 passengers.

Environs
Karatsu City Sari Elementary School

References

External links
Sari Station (JR Kyushu)

Railway stations in Saga Prefecture
Stations of Kyushu Railway Company
Chikuhi Line
Railway stations in Japan opened in 1935